The 22nd Beijing College Student Film Festival was held from 11 April to 9 May 2015 in Beijing, China.

Winners and nominees

References

External links
  22nd Beijing College Student Film Festival Sina

23
2015 film festivals
2015 festivals in Asia
Bei